Arfvedsonite is a sodium amphibole mineral with composition: [Na][Na2][(Fe2+)4Fe3+][(OH)2|Si8O22].  It crystallizes in the monoclinic prismatic crystal system and typically occurs as greenish black to bluish grey fibrous to radiating or stellate prisms. 

It is a rather rare mineral occurring in nepheline syenite intrusions and agpaitic (peralkaline) pegmatites and granites as the Golden Horn batholith in Okanogan County, Washington (type locality for zektzerite).  Occurrences include Mont Saint-Hilaire, Quebec, Canada; the Ilímaussaq complex  in Southern Greenland; and in pegmatites of the Kola Peninsula, Russia. Its mineral association includes nepheline, albite, aegirine, riebeckite, katophorite and quartz.

Arfvedsonite was discovered in 1823 and named for the Swedish chemist Johan August Arfwedson (1792–1841).

See also 
 List of minerals
 List of minerals named after people

References 

 Deer, W.A., R.A. Howie, and J. Zussman (1963) Rock-forming Minerals, v. 2, Chain Silicates, p. 364–374
 Mineral Galleries

Amphibole group
Sodium minerals
Iron(II,III) minerals
Magnesium minerals
Monoclinic minerals
Minerals in space group 12